Pennsylvania Canal Guard Lock and Feeder Dam, Raystown Branch, also known as the Raystown Branch Feeder Canal, is a historic canal structure located at Henderson Township in Huntingdon County, Pennsylvania. The property includes the remains of a guard lock and feeder dam.  The guard lock was built in 1831, and the remains consist of two 90-foot-long parallel walls, 8 feet high and 15 feet apart.  The remains of the feeder dam consist of stone and earth remnants of a dam that once stretched across the Juniata River.  The lock and dam were built to allow boats built on Standing Stone Creek to enter the Pennsylvania Canal.  The lock and dam were abandoned with the rest of the Pennsylvania Canal in the 1870s.

It was listed on the National Register of Historic Places in 1990.

References 

Industrial buildings and structures on the National Register of Historic Places in Pennsylvania
Transport infrastructure completed in 1831
Buildings and structures in Huntingdon County, Pennsylvania
Transportation buildings and structures in Huntingdon County, Pennsylvania
National Register of Historic Places in Huntingdon County, Pennsylvania